Hamilton Place may refer to:

FirstOntario Concert Hall (formerly Hamilton Place Theatre), Hamilton, Ontario
Hamilton Place, London, a street with its origins in the 1660s
Hamilton Place, Singapore, a road within Seletar Aerospace Park
Hamilton Place (shopping mall), Chattanooga, Tennessee
Hamilton Place (Columbia, Tennessee), listed on the National Register of Historic Places (NRHP)
Hamilton Place within Hamilton Place Historic District, St. Louis, Missouri, NRHP-listed
Alexander Hamilton Place, Washington, DC, at the south facade of the U.S. Treasury Building